Irene May Lovelock (26 May 1896 – 9 August 1974) was the founder of the British Housewives' League.

Early life
She was born Irene May Northover Smith on 26 May 1896 in Wood Green, London, the elder daughter of an ironmonger, William Northover Smith (1864–1953), and his wife, Florence Minnie Heath (1869–1943). She was educated in Margate and Finchley, and at the Birmingham School for Young Ladies.

Career
Lovelock formed the British Housewives' League in June 1945, and was its chairman, until April 1946, when she became president. Its membership was more than 70,000 in 1948.

Personal life
Her husband was a Church of England clergyman, the Revd John Herbert Lovelock (1903–1986), and they had three children.

Lovelock died at St George's Hospital, Tooting, London, on 9 August 1974.

References

1896 births
1974 deaths
British activists
People from Wood Green